This is a list of conservation, natural resource and ecology-related organisations in Tanzania, including both Tanzanian based organisations and international organisations represented in Tanzania.

 African Conservation Foundation
 African Wildlife Foundation
 Conservation Resource Centre
 Tanzania National Parks Authority
 Protected Area Management Solutions (PAMS)
 Frankfurt Zoological Society (FZS)
 Tanzania Environmental Conservation Society (TECOSO Tanzania)

See also
List of conservation organisations
List of environmental organizations

Nature conservation in Tanzania
Organisations based in Tanzania